Jamejam is an Iranian newspaper in Fars Province. The Concessionaire of this newspaper was Rahbar Shirazi Alireza Roostayian and it was published in Shiraz since 1915.

See also
List of magazines and newspapers of Fars

References

Newspapers published in Fars Province
Mass media in Fars Province
Publications established in 1915
1915 establishments in Iran
Newspapers published in Qajar Iran